Martin Shakar (born January 1, 1940) is an American theatre, film and television actor.

He was born in Detroit, Michigan to an Armenian/Assyrian family from Adıyaman, Turkey and lives in Brooklyn, New York.

A life member of The Actors Studio, Shakar has played in a number of Broadway and off-Broadway productions. He has appeared four times each in the television shows The Equalizer and Law & Order, but each instance was a different character.  He has appeared in 15 films since 1976.  His most notable role was in Saturday Night Fever as Frank Manero, Jr., older brother to John Travolta's Tony Manero.  He has also appeared in a number of television advertisements, usually playing Italian or Arab roles.

Filmography

References

External links
 
 
 

1940 births
American male film actors
Living people
Male actors from Detroit
American people of Assyrian descent
American people of Armenian descent
People from Dearborn, Michigan